Spell My Name Right: The Album is the debut studio album by East Coast hip hop producer Statik Selektah. The album was released on November 6, 2007. The album features guest appearances from DJ Premier, Termanology, Styles P, Q-Tip, Talib Kweli, Consequence, Joell Ortiz, Kool G Rap, Sheek Louch, Freeway, Cassidy, DJ Khaled, Red Café, Mims,  Uncle Murda, Jadakiss, Royce da 5'9", Cormega, Reks,  Doug E. Fresh, Tony Touch, Scram Jones, Esoteric, Clinton Sparks, Big Shug, Lil Fame, AZ, Slum Village, Granite State, Evidence, The Alchemist, Skyzoo, KRS-One and Large Professor among others.

Track listing
All songs produced by Statik Selektah

References

2007 debut albums
Statik Selektah albums
Albums produced by Statik Selektah